The Penly Nuclear power station is found some  northeast of Dieppe. It lies on the border of two French municipalities: Penly and Saint-Martin-en-Campagne in the département of Seine-Maritime, Normandy, on the English Channel coast. It employs France's only working funicular railway in industrial use.

Data
The plant employs about 670 people full-time and is owned and operated by the French company Électricité de France. Water from the English Channel is used for cooling.

The two PWR units are of the 1330 MWe class.  The installed total output is 2764 MW, which means the plant is about average for French nuclear plants.  It feeds on average about 18 billion kilowatt-hours per year into the public grid, corresponding to about 80% of the current annual consumption of Normandy. It is about ten kilometres from Dieppe.

Proposed third and fourth reactors
In January 2009, the French government announced that a third reactor, the second French EPR reactor, would be built in Penly. Construction was announced for 2012 with connection to the grid following in 2017. GDF Suez was to own a part of the plant, with the majority taken by EDF. However, in 2010 GDF Suez withdrew from the project.
In 2011, following the Fukushima Daiichi nuclear disaster, EDF postponed public consultations putting in doubt the 2012 construction start date. In February 2013, the Minister of Industrial Renewal Arnaud Montebourg stated that the plans for a new EPR reactor at Penly had been canceled, citing the capacity for electricity production and massive investments in renewable energy along with his confidence in the EPR as a competitive project in foreign countries.

In 2019, EDF is seeking a site for the construction of a pair of EPR reactors, and Penly is considered as one of the lead contenders.

Accidents and incidents 

9 June 2004 - Weakly radioactive water was leaked into the sea from the reserve tank of a reactor's secondary circuit.

11 October 2011 - A subcontractor employee had localised contamination on his face.

5 April 2012 - 10 Fire engines attended a small fire within a reactor building. The operating company later reported two small oil fires inside the reactor building from a leaking oil pipe were extinguished with nobody hurt and no environmental impact. The detection of smoke caused the reactor to be automatically shut down.

6 April 2012 - As a consequence of the incident of 5 April 2012 a joint had leaked radioactive water into collection tanks inside the reactor building.
The incident was classified as 1 (lowest) on the 7 point International Nuclear Event Scale.

8th March 2023 - Due to potentially serious cracks in the pipework of the secondary cooling circuit, layered safety may have been compromised (INES 2)

References

External links
 Site officiel de la centrale de Penly
 Commission particulière du débat public - Penly 3
 La construction d'un deuxième réacteur nucléaire EPR fait polémique

Nuclear power stations in France
Buildings and structures in Seine-Maritime
Nuclear power stations with proposed reactors
Électricité de France